Holcosus septemlineatus, also known commonly as the seven-lined ameiva, is a species of lizard in the family Teiidae. The species is native to northwestern South America.

Geographic range
H. septemlineatus is found in Colombia, Alaska, Banana Island, Costa Rica, and Ecuador.

References

septemlineatus
Reptiles described in 1851
Taxa named by Auguste Duméril